Rafał Zaborowski (born 1 March 1994) is a Polish professional footballer who currently playing as an attacking midfielder.
 In his career, Zaborowski also played for teams such as Ruch Radzionków, Viitorul Târgu Jiu or Irodotos, among others.

Playing career

Stadion Śląski Chorzów
Zaborowski was born in Chorzów. At the age of six he started playing for Stadion Śląski Chorzów – a club known for developing young players.

Ruch Radzionków
In the summer of 2013, Zaborowski signed a two-year professional contract with Polish I liga side Ruch Radzionków.

LZS Piotrówka
In August 2015, after financial problems in Ruch Radzionków, Zaborowski decided to leave on loan to LZS Piotrówka.

JKS 1909 Jarosław
After leaving Piotrówka in the winter of 2016, Zaborowski signed with Jarosław in March. Despite an unsuccessful fight for promotion, he managed to win the regional Polish Cup tournament during his tenure with JKS.

Harstad IL
In March 2017, Zaborowski signed a two-year contract with 2. divisjon side Harstad. It was his first abroad contract.

Irodotos FC

In early January 2019, Zaborowski joined Greek Super League 2 side Irodotos. He was initially unable to make his debut due to issues with receiving his certificate from Norway. Zaborowski made his debut on 28 January 2019 in a 0–1 loss against Panachaiki. On 10 March, Zaborowski scored the decisive goal in a 2–1 win against Chania in the Crete derby. Due to the reorganization of the league in Greece after the 2019/20 season, his team was relegated and he left the club shortly after.

ACS Viitorul Târgu Jiu
After a successful season in Greece, despite offers in Greece, Lithuania and Cyprus, Zaborowski joined Liga II side Viitorul Târgu Jiu on 5 September 2019.

Partizán Bardejov
On 21 February, after picking up an injury at Viitorul and deciding to move closer to his family, Zaborowski signed with 2. liga club Partizán Bardejov on 21 February 2020. Due to the season being suspended and eventually cancelled because of the lockdown in Slovakia, Zaborowski played only one game for his new club, in which he made an assist and was chosen as the best player of his team.

CS Pandurii Târgu Jiu
Despite offers from Slovakia, Greece and Cyprus in summer 2020, Zaborowski made his return to Romania after signing a one-year contract with Liga II side Pandurii Târgu Jiu.

Swadhinata Krira Sangha
On 24 November 2021, Zaborowski joined Bangladesh Premier League side Swadhinata Krira Sangha on a one-year deal. He made his debut in Independence Cup against Dhaka Abahani which his Team lost 2:1 but he noted an assist from a free-kick cross and in the important game for a promotion to the next round for the club against Rahmatganj MFS he show high performance and pulled the team to victory by scoring 2 goals which his Team won 3:2 and contributing significantly to the promotion of his club to the quarter-final. In the club's debut match in the Premier League Bangladesh Premier League against Bashundhara Kings the Champion and AFC Cup participant 2022 AFC Cup, with his good performance helped to get 3 points and made a big contribution to the scored goal for 1-0 when after his action a penalty kick was dictated. Game against Bangladesh Police FC despite Rafel's high disposition and scoring a goal and noting an assist, the team lost. This didn't prevent him from being chosen for The Man of the Match.

Honours
Ruch Radzionków
 III liga: 2014–15

References

1994 births
Living people
Sportspeople from Chorzów
Polish footballers
Poland youth international footballers
Association football midfielders
Association football forwards
Ruch Radzionków players
LZS Piotrówka players
Harstad IL players
Irodotos FC players
Liga II players
ACS Viitorul Târgu Jiu players
CS Pandurii Târgu Jiu players
2. Liga (Slovakia) players
Partizán Bardejov players
Polish expatriate footballers
Polish expatriate sportspeople in Norway
Expatriate footballers in Norway
Polish expatriate sportspeople in Greece
Expatriate footballers in Greece
Polish expatriate sportspeople in Romania
Expatriate footballers in Romania
Polish expatriate sportspeople in Slovakia
Expatriate footballers in Slovakia